The 2018 Gagarin Cup playoffs of the Kontinental Hockey League (KHL) began on March 3, 2018, with the top eight teams from each of the conferences, following the conclusion of the 2017–18 KHL regular season.

Playoff seeds
After the regular season, the standard 16 teams qualified for the playoffs. The Western Conference regular season winners and Continental Cup winners are SKA Saint Petersburg with 138 points. Ak Bars Kazan are the Eastern Conference regular season winners with 100 points.

Draw

Player statistics

Scoring leaders

  
As of 22 Apr 2018

Source: KHL

Leading goaltenders

As of 22 Apr 2018

Source: KHL

References

2017–18 KHL season
Gagarin Cup